Vakarel Saddle, Smith Island  
 Valchan Peak, Sentinel Range
 Valchedram Island, Livingston Island 
 Valkosel Ridge, Oscar II Coast 
 Valoga Glacier, Sentinel Range
 Vanand Peak, Sentinel Range  
 Vapa Cove, Liège Island
 Vaptsarov Peak, Livingston Island 
 Varad Point, Foyn Coast
 Varbak Point, Smith Island 
 Vardim Rocks, Livingston Island 
 Vardun Point, Graham Coast 
 Varna Peninsula, Livingston Island  
 Varshets Saddle, Smith Island  
 Vartop Point, Graham Coast
 Varvara Cove, Nelson Island  
 Vasilev Bay, Livingston Island
 Vaskidovich Ridge, Alexander Island
 Vaugondy Island, Biscoe Islands 
 Vazharov Peak, Liège Island 
 Vazov Point, Livingston Island  
 Vazov Rock, Livingston Island  
 Vedena Cove, Smith Island  
 Vedrare Nunatak, Nordenskjöld Coast
 Velcha Cove, Astrolabe Island
 Veleka Ridge, Livingston Island  
 Veles Bastion, Brabant Island
 Velichkov Knoll, Davis Coast
 Velikan Point, Smith Island  
 Velingrad Peninsula, Graham Coast  
 Venchan Bluff, Brabant Island
 Venev Point, Low Island 
 Verdikal Gap, Trinity Peninsula  
 Veregava Ridge, Sentinel Range  
 Vergilov Ridge, Livingston Island
 Vergilov Rocks, Livingston Island  
 Verila Glacier, Livingston Island 
 Versinikia Peak, Sentinel Range
 Veselie Glacier, Oscar II Coast
 Veshka Point, Graham Coast 
 Vetrilo Rocks, Wilhelm Archipelago
 Vetrino Glacier, Smith Island  
 Vetrovala Peak, Trinity Peninsula
 Veyka Point, Two Hummock Island 
 Viamata Saddle, Brabant Island
 Vicha Glacier, Sentinel Range 
 Vichina Cove, Nelson Island
 Vidbol Glacier, Danco Coast  
 Vidin Heights, Livingston Island  
 Vidul Glacier, Sentinel Range
 Vihren Peak, Livingston Island  
 Vilare Island, Robert Island
 Vineh Peak, Rugged Island
 Vinitsa Cove, Davis Coast  
 Vinogradi Peak, Trinity Peninsula  
 Vinson Plateau, Vinson Massif  
 Vishegrad Knoll, Trinity Peninsula  
 Vishna Pass, Oscar II Coast
 Viskyar Ridge, Greenwich Island  
 Vit Ice Piedmont, Sentinel Range
 Vitosha Saddle, Livingston Island  
 Vladaya Saddle, Livingston Island 
 Vladigerov Passage, Biscoe Islands 
 Voden Heights, Oscar II Coast
 Vodoley Rock, Livingston Island
 Vokil Point, Snow Island 
 Vola Ridge, Alexander Island 
 Vologes Ridge, Foyn Coast
 Volov Peak, Davis Coast  
 Volturnus Lake, Livingston Island
 Voluyak Rocks, Greenwich Island 
 Voysil Peak, Sentinel Range  
 Voyteh Point, Livingston Island  
 Vrabcha Cove, Robert Island  
 Vrachesh Glacier, Nordenskjöld Coast
 Vranya Pass, Sentinel Range  
 Vratsa Peak, Greenwich Island  
 Vrelo Peak, Oscar II Coast
 Vromos Island, Anvers Island
 Vund Point, Rugged Island

See also 
 Bulgarian toponyms in Antarctica

External links 
 Bulgarian Antarctic Gazetteer
 SCAR Composite Gazetteer of Antarctica
 Antarctic Digital Database (ADD). Scale 1:250000 topographic map of Antarctica with place-name search.
 L. Ivanov. Bulgarian toponymic presence in Antarctica. Polar Week at the National Museum of Natural History in Sofia, 2–6 December 2019

Bibliography 
 J. Stewart. Antarctica: An Encyclopedia. Jefferson, N.C. and London: McFarland, 2011. 1771 pp.  
 L. Ivanov. Bulgarian Names in Antarctica. Sofia: Manfred Wörner Foundation, 2021. Second edition. 539 pp.  (in Bulgarian)
 G. Bakardzhieva. Bulgarian toponyms in Antarctica. Paisiy Hilendarski University of Plovdiv: Research Papers. Vol. 56, Book 1, Part A, 2018 – Languages and Literature, pp. 104-119 (in Bulgarian)
 L. Ivanov and N. Ivanova. Bulgarian names. In: The World of Antarctica. Generis Publishing, 2022. pp. 114-115. 

Antarctica
 
Bulgarian toponyms in Antarctica
Names of places in Antarctica